Phtheochroa unionana is a species of moth of the family Tortricidae. It is found in Romania, the Near East and the Caucasus.

The wingspan is about 20 mm. Adults have been recorded on wing from June to July.

References

Moths described in 1900
Phtheochroa